Camp de l'Arpa is a station on line 5 of the Barcelona Metro. It is named after the neighbourhood of the same name in the Sant Martí district.

The station is located underneath Carrer Indústria, between Passeig Maragall and Carrer Guinardó. It was opened in 1970.

The side-platform station has a ticket hall on either end, each with one access, on Carrer Indústria and Passeig Maragall.

Services

External links

  Camp de l'Arpa at Trenscat.com

Railway stations in Spain opened in 1970
Barcelona Metro line 5 stations